Planica 1960 was international ski flying week competition, held from 26 to 27 March 1960 in Planica, PR Slovenia, FPR Yugoslavia. A total crowd of 63,000 spectators gathered over four days.

This was the first ever TV international live broadcast transmission from Slovenia for European Broadcasting Union (EBU) and produced by RTV Ljubljana.

Schedule

Competitions

On 24 March 1960, first training on Srednja Bloudkova K80 normal hill was on schedule in front of 3,000 people, which also counted as qualification for main international event on large hill. There were 42 competitors from twelve countries performing in trial and two rounds for points. Helmut Recknagel won this independent (qualification) event for the main competition with 227.5 points.

On 25 March 1960, first training day on Bloudkova velikanka K120 large hill was on schedule in front of 15,000 people. With total three rounds, two of them were rated with points if one of two official competition days would be canceled. Helmut Recknagel was highest rated with new hill record at 124 metres.

On 26 March 1960, first day of competition on Bloudkova velikanka K120 large hill was on schedule in front of 15,000 people with only two rounds due to strong winds, only one jump counting into final result. Helmut Recknagel was leading after first day of competition with longest jump of the day at 118.5 metres.

On 27 March 1960, second and final day of competition on Bloudkova velikanka K120 large hill was on schedule in front of 30,000 people, with total four rounds and three counting into final result. Helmut Recknagel won the two day competition (1 best from Saturday and 3 best jumps from Sunday) for the second time in a row, with hill record at 127 metres.

Training 1 (Qualifications) 
24 March 1960 – Srednja Bloudkova K80 – Three rounds (trial + 2 counting)

Training 2 
25 March 1960 – Bloudkova velikanka K120 – Three round (Trial + 2 counting)

International Ski Flying Week: Day 1 
26 March 1960 – Bloudkova velikanka K120 – Two rounds (1 best counting)

 Fall or touch!

International Ski Flying Week: Day 2 
27 March 1960 – Bloudkova velikanka K120 – Four rounds (3 best counting)

Official results 

26–27 March 1960 – Bloudkova velikanka K120 – Four rounds (1 Saturday + 3 Sunday)

Team 
Competition was held in memory of then recently late Stanko Bloudek (1890–1959), a Slovenian engineer and co-constructor of Bloudkova velikanka, as well as one of three main Planica pioneers. France, with one competitor, didn't compete.

Stanko Bloudek Memorial

Hill records

References

1960 in Yugoslav sport
1960 in ski jumping
1960 in Slovenia
Ski jumping competitions in Yugoslavia
International sports competitions hosted by Yugoslavia
Ski jumping competitions in Slovenia
International sports competitions hosted by Slovenia